Peter P. Klassen (1926 – 29 July 2018) was a Russian Mennonite author who wrote in the German language. He fled with his parents from Soviet Russia to Paraguay, arriving there in 1931. He has had a distinguished career as the premier historian of Mennonites in South America. Klassen has also worked as a teacher and was a long-time editor of the Paraguayan Mennonite newspaper Mennoblatt.

Selected works
 Die Mennoniten in Paraguay. Band 1: Reich Gottes und Reich dieser Welt (Bolanden-Weierhof, Germany 2001) 
 Kaputi Mennonita. Eine friedliche Begegnung im Chaco-Krieg (Asuncion, Paraguay 1976)
 Und ob ich schon wanderte... Geschichten zur Geschichte der Wanderung und Flucht der Mennoniten von Preussen über Russland nach Amerika (Bolanden-Weierhof, Germany 1997)
 Die schwarzen Reiter. Geschichten zur Geschichte eines Glaubensprinzips (Uchte, Germany 1999)
 So geschehen in Kronsweide (Germany 2003)

References

External links
 Books by Peter P. Klassen in the German National Library (Deutsche Nationalbibliothek)
 Laudatio für Peter P. Klassen by Jakob Warkentin (2006)
 "The 'Green Hell' Becomes Home: Mennonites in Paraguay as Described in the Writings of Peter P. Klassen" by Gerhard Reimer, Mennonite Quarterly Review 2002
 Pledge of Allegiance by Peter P. Klassen (2008)

1926 births
2018 deaths
Mennonite writers
Paraguayan Mennonites
German-language writers
Soviet emigrants to Paraguay
Paraguayan people of German descent
Paraguayan male writers
People from Boquerón Department